John Adams College and Career Academy is a public high school located on the east side of Cleveland, Ohio, United States. It is part of the Cleveland Metropolitan School District.

History
John Adams High School opened at East 116th Street and Corlett Avenue in 1923. It was closed in 1995, along with West Technical, and Aviation High Schools to help cut the city's budget. The school was rebuilt and opened in 2006.

Clubs and activities
The school's Latin Club functions as a local chapter of both the Ohio Junior Classical League (OJCL) and National Junior Classical League (NJCL).

School uniforms
The school followed the district dress code requiring polo shirts and dress trousers, skirts, and/or shorts. In 2014 it adopted a new rule requiring polo shirts with monogrammed school logos.

Sports
The mascot for the school is the Rebel. The primary rivals for the school's sports teams are the John F. Kennedy Eagles, who are located nearby, and the James Ford Rhodes Rams on the west side.

Ohio High School Athletic Association State Championships

 Boys Track and Field — 1953, 1956, 1976, 1982
 Girls Track and Field — 1978, 1979, 1994
 Boys Cross Country — 1954, 1959, 1963

Notable alumni
 Rashaun Allen, NFL player
 William Appling (1932 - 2008), conductor, music educator, pianist and arranger
 Albert Ayler (1936–1970), jazz saxophonist and composer
 Dick Feagler (1938-2018), columnist
 Frederick Fennell (1914–2004), conductor and music educator
 Tom Jackson (1951–), retired NFL linebacker (Denver Broncos), ESPN NFL analyst
 Don King (1931–), boxing promoter
 Rimp Lanier, Former MLB player (Pittsburgh Pirates)
 Al Lerner (composer) (b. 1919), pianist, composer, and musical director
 Madeline Manning (1948-), Track and Field Olympic gold medalist
 Nick Mileti (1931-), former owner, Cleveland Cavaliers and Cleveland Indians. In fact, he chose the Cavs' colors of wine and gold based on John Adams' colors.
 Anthony Morgan, Former NFL player for the Chicago Bears (1991–1993) and the Green Bay Packers (1993–1996).
 Frank Pokorny, member of the Ohio House of Representatives (1957–1960; 1963–1968) and Cuyahoga County Commissioner (1968-1976)
 Jack Reynolds (1937-2008) radio and television broadcaster on numerous Cleveland stations, professional wrestling announcer (including for the WWF)
 Phillip Shriver (1922–2011), served as president of Miami University from 1965 to 1981
 Chuck Smith, Former MLB player (Florida Marlins)
 Mark E. Talisman (1941–2019), congressional aide and lobbyist
 Robert Ward (1917–2013), composer

References

External links
 
 John Adams High School yearbooks and newsletters available on Cleveland Public Library Digital Gallery, various years 1927 through 1962 
  

High schools in Cuyahoga County, Ohio
Education in Cleveland
Educational institutions established in 1923
Public high schools in Ohio
1923 establishments in Ohio
Cleveland Metropolitan School District
Monuments and memorials to John F. Kennedy in the United States
School buildings completed in 1923
School buildings completed in 2006